The first season of the American animated television series SpongeBob SquarePants, created by former marine biologist and animator Stephen Hillenburg, aired on Nickelodeon from May 1, 1999, to March 3, 2001, and consists of 20 half-hour episodes. The series chronicles the exploits and adventures of the title character and his various friends in the fictional underwater city of Bikini Bottom. The show features the voices of Tom Kenny, Bill Fagerbakke, Rodger Bumpass, Clancy Brown, Mr. Lawrence, Jill Talley, Carolyn Lawrence, Mary Jo Catlett, and Lori Alan. Among the first guest stars to appear on the show were Ernest Borgnine and Tim Conway voicing the superhero characters of Mermaid Man and Barnacle Boy, respectively.

Hillenburg initially conceived the show in 1994 and began to work on it shortly after the cancellation of Rocko's Modern Life in 1996. To voice the character of SpongeBob, Hillenburg approached Tom Kenny, who had worked with him on Rocko's Modern Life. The show was originally to be called SpongeBoy Ahoy!, but the name SpongeBoy was already in use for an art pencil product. Upon finding it out, Hillenburg decided to use the name "SpongeBob". He chose "SquarePants" as a family name as it referred to the character's square shape and it had a "nice ring to it".

Several compilation DVDs that contained episodes from the season were released. The SpongeBob SquarePants: The Complete 1st Season DVD was released in Region 1 on October 28, 2003, Region 2 on November 7, 2005, and Region 4 on November 30, 2006. The pilot episode, "Help Wanted", was not included on the DVD due to copyright issues with the song "Livin' in the Sunlight, Lovin' in the Moonlight" by Tiny Tim, which appears in the episode, but was later released as a bonus feature on various series DVDs, including that of the third season. The season received positive reviews from media critics upon release.

Development

Creator Stephen Hillenburg initially conceived SpongeBob SquarePants in 1984, while he was teaching and studying marine biology at what is now the Orange County Ocean Institute. 

While Hillenburg was there, his love of the ocean began to influence his artistry. He created a precursor to SpongeBob SquarePants: a comic book titled The Intertidal Zone used by the institute to teach visiting students about the animal life of tide pools. The comic starred various anthropomorphic sea lifeforms, many of which would evolve into SpongeBob SquarePants characters. Hillenburg tried to get the comic professionally published, but none of the companies he sent it to were interested. In 1987, Hillenburg left the institute to pursue his dream of becoming an animator. In 1992, Hillenburg began to attend the California Institute of the Arts to study animation, having been accepted into the institute by Jules Engel, who was impressed with Hillenburg's previous work.

While attending animation school, Hillenburg received a job on the children's television series Mother Goose and Grimm, and worked on the series from 1991 to 1993. During his time at the California Institute of the Arts, he made his thesis film entitled Wormholes, which was funded by the Princess Grace Foundation and was later displayed at various animation festivals. In 1992, Joe Murray, who had just sold his show Rocko's Modern Life to Nickelodeon, met Hillenburg at an animation festival, and offered him a job as a director of the series.

By the time Rocko's Modern Life concluded in 1996, Hillenburg had risen to the rank of creative director and showrunner following Murray's departure from the show. Shortly following this, Hillenburg began developing SpongeBob SquarePants, using The Intertidal Zone as basis for the show following a discussion with Rocko writer Martin Olson, and worked with several Nickelodeon veterans and Rocko crew members, including creative director Derek Drymon, writers and directors Sherm Cohen and Dan Povenmire, writer Tim Hill, Martin Olson, animation director Alan Smart, and story editor Merriwether Williams. To voice the character of SpongeBob, Hillenburg approached Tom Kenny, who had worked with him on Rocko's Modern Life. Originally, Hillenburg wanted to use the name SpongeBoy—the character had no last name—and the series would have been called SpongeBoy Ahoy!. However, the Nickelodeon legal department discovered that the name SpongeBoy was already in use for an art themed pencil product. This was discovered after voice acting for the original seven-minute pilot was recorded in 1997. In November 1997, upon finding this out, Hillenburg decided that the character's given name still had to contain "Sponge" so viewers would not mistake the character for a "Cheese Man". Hillenburg decided to use the name "SpongeBob". He chose "SquarePants" as a family name as it referred to the character's square shape and it had a "nice ring to it".

Production

Cast

The first season featured Tom Kenny as the voice of the title character SpongeBob SquarePants and his pet snail Gary. SpongeBob's best friend, a starfish named Patrick Star, was voiced by Bill Fagerbakke, while Rodger Bumpass played the voice of Squidward Tentacles, an arrogant and ill-tempered octopus. Other members of the cast were Clancy Brown as Mr. Krabs, a miserly crab obsessed with money and SpongeBob's boss at the Krusty Krab; Mr. Lawrence as Plankton, a small green copepod and Mr. Krabs' business rival; Jill Talley as Karen, Plankton's sentient computer wife; Carolyn Lawrence as Sandy Cheeks, a squirrel from Texas; Mary Jo Catlett as Mrs. Puff, SpongeBob's boating school teacher; and Lori Alan as Pearl Krabs, a teenage whale who is Mr. Krabs' daughter.

While Hillenburg, Derek Drymon, and Tim Hill were writing the pilot "Help Wanted", Hillenburg was also conducting auditions to find voices for the show characters. He had created the character of SpongeBob with Tom Kenny, in which he utilised Kenny's and other people's personalities to help create SpongeBob's personality. The voice of SpongeBob was originally used by Kenny for a minor female alligator character named Al in Rocko's Modern Life. Kenny forgot the voice initially as he created it only for that single use. Hillenburg, however, remembered it when he was coming up with SpongeBob and used a video clip of the episode to remind Kenny of the voice. Kenny said that SpongeBob's high pitched laugh was specifically aimed at being unique, stating that they wanted an annoying laugh in the tradition of Popeye and Woody Woodpecker. Hillenburg originally had Mr. Lawrence for the role of voicing Squidward. Drymon said "We knew Doug from Rocko, where he was a storyboard director and where he also did the voice of Filburt. We were showing Doug the storyboard, and he started reading back to us in his Tony the Tiger/Gregory Peck voice. It was really funny, and we wound up having SpongeBob use a deep voice when he entered the Krusty Krab for the first time." Hillenburg loved the voice and decided to let Lawrence play a variety of incidental characters, including Plankton.

In addition to the regular cast members, episodes feature guest voices from many ranges of professions, including actors, musicians, and artists. Former McHale's Navy actors Ernest Borgnine and Tim Conway reunited for their first joint TV project in 33 years as guest actors portraying SpongeBob's favorite superheroes, Mermaid Man and Barnacle Boy, respectively. Borgnine said "We [he and Conway] played off each other. Tim's such a performer – a little more caustic than I am. We were making all sorts of noise. People outside the room were guffawing. We're supposed to be underwater, you know." They would reprise their role in the episode "Mermaid Man and Barnacle Boy II", which also guest starred Charles Nelson Reilly as their nemesis, the Dirty Bubble. In the episode "Scaredy Pants", a Halloween special, American band the Ghastly Ones performed a special musical performance, while Brian Doyle-Murray voiced the Flying Dutchman. American country guitarist and singer Junior Brown made a vocal cameo, performing the song "Texas" in the episode of the same name. In "Neptune's Spatula", John O'Hurley appeared as King Neptune. John Lurie and Jim Jarmusch (who collaborated to make the films Stranger Than Paradise and Down by Law) made a cameo as themselves in the episode "Hooky", through excerpts from the Bravo serial, Fishing with John.

Writing

Prior to start of production on the show, Hillenburg decided early that he wanted SpongeBob SquarePants to be a storyboard-driven show, rather than script-driven. Storyboard-driven is an approach that required artists who could take a skeletal story outline and flesh it out with sight gags, dialogue and a structure that "would strike a balance between narrative and whimsy." Hillenburg originally wanted "a team of young and hungry people" to work on the show. The group, who worked with Hillenburg on Rocko's Modern Life before, consisted of Alan Smart, Nick Jennings, and Derek Drymon. Tim Hill was asked about if he want to work as story editor, but he was unavailable at the time. The crew got Peter Burns to work as story editor who developed the idea for the episode "Ripped Pants" about SpongeBob ripping his pants.

During the first season, the writing staff used most of the story ideas that were in Hillenburg's series bible and they had problems on how to generate new ideas. At one point, the writing staff went to the beach for inspiration for a possible episode. However, the day "was overcast and cold, so we [the writers] had to stay in the car." Drymon said "We didn't come up with too many ideas that day." Story editor Peter Burns left, and the crew had Merriwether Williams to overtake. Hillenburg said to Williams that "it was her responsibility to get us [the writers] to come up with new ideas." Drymon said "[It] is a tall order." Williams gave Drymon a book called Zen in the Art of Writing, written by Ray Bradbury, that catalogs a collection of essays about writing processes. One of the ways in the book to inspire plots was "to write nouns that interested him [Bradbury] on a note card and hang them in his office. He felt just having the word in his eyesight would get his mind working." Williams took this scheme and made it into "a writing exercise." In writing meetings, the staff would all enumerate 10 nouns on strips of paper and place them in a hat. The hat would be passed throughout and a writer would have a limited time to spawn an idea based on the noun he wrote. Drymon said "It would almost always start a discussion, and we wound up getting a lot of episodes out of it." Furthermore, Drymon said that Williams "really came up with a great addition to the process."

One time, Hillenburg came to Williams and said, "Why don't you go read a bunch of books about writing." Hillenburg wanted to keep the enthusiasm in the writing room, because, according to Williams, "sometimes it can be a slog." She went off, read more books about writing, and came up with two more exercises for writing meetings.

Animation and design
The animation was handled overseas in South Korea at Rough Draft Studios. Throughout the season's run, from 1999 to 2001, SpongeBob was animated using cel animation. The show shifted to digital ink and paint animation during its second season in 2000. Executive producer Paul Tibbitt, in 2009, said "[...] The first season of SpongeBob was done the old-fashioned way on cells, and every cell had to be part-painted, left to dry, paint some other colors. It's still a time-consuming aspect of the process now, but the digital way of doing things means it doesn't take long to correct." The season was storyboarded and written by Sherm Cohen, Derek Drymon, Steve Fonti, Stephen Hillenburg, Chuck Klein, Jay Lender, Chris Mitchell, Mark O'Hare, Aaron Springer, Paul Tibbitt, Ennio Torresan, Vincent Waller, and Erik Wiese.

When the crew began production on the pilot, they were tasked to design the stock locations where "[...] the show would return to again and again, and in which most of the action would take place, such as the Krusty Krab and SpongeBob's pineapple house." Hillenburg had a "clear vision" of what he wanted the show to look like. The idea was "to keep everything nautical" so the crew used lots of rope, wooden planks, ships' wheels, netting, anchors, and boilerplate and rivets.

The season marked the introduction of the "sky flowers" as the main background. It first appeared in the pilot and has since become a common feature throughout the series. When series background designer Kenny Pittenger was asked "What are those things?," he answered "They function as clouds in a way, but since the show takes place underwater, they aren't really clouds." Since the show was influenced by tiki, the background painters have to use a lot of pattern. Pittenger said "So really, the sky flowers are mostly a whimsical design element that Steve [Hillenburg] came up with to evoke the look of a flower-print Hawaiian shirt—or something like that. I don't know what they are either."

Reception
The season was critically acclaimed. Three of its episodes won Best Sound Editing in Television Animation at the 2000 Golden Reel Awards. It consisted of the episodes "Mermaid Man and Barnacle Boy" and "Pickles" for Music, while the "Karate Choppers" won for the Sound. In 2001, "Rock Bottom" and "Arrgh!" also won the Golden Reel Awards for Best Sound Editing in Television Animation — Sound, while "Fools in April" and "Neptune's Spatula" were nominated for Best Sound Editing in Television Animation — Music.

In his review for the Variety, Noel Holston said "[The show] is smarter and freakier than most of the prime-time animated series that have popped up in the past year." Furthermore, most of the first season DVD reviews were positive towards the series as being one of the best American comedy shows. In a DVD review by Bill Treadway for DVD Verdict, he called the show "the best animated American comedy since The Simpsons, it is a claim I stand behind." Treadway said the show is "accessible to all" that "adults will enjoy the witty satire and sly in-jokes subtly inserted into every episode." He also mentioned that "children will love the bright colors, spunky pace, and lively characters" and that "parents will not have to worry about violence or crude humor." Jason Bovberg of DVD Talk called SpongeBob SquarePants "the coolest Saturday morning cartoon since the heyday of Warner Bros." In a separate review for the season's DVD release, Bovberg "highly recommended" the set and wrote "I love the show so much, I can't see any way around giving this one a recommendation." Bovberg was particular on the exclusion of the pilot episode "Help Wanted", saying "But why is 'Help Wanted' missing? I suppose I'll have to buy a "theme" disc down the road to secure that one. Sigh." Furthermore, he described it as "the only disappointment of the set." Ron J. Epstein, also from DVD Talk, said that the character of SpongeBob is "one of the strangest cartoon characters I have ever had the pleasure to watch." He said that "Unlike most cartoons today, SpongeBob SquarePants caters to both a child and an adult audience."

In his review for The Washington Post, Michael Cavna rewatched the pilot episode "Help Wanted" in 2009 and said "so much of the style and polish are already in place." He ranked the episode at  3 at his The Top Five SpongeBob Episodes: We Pick 'Em list. Nancy Basile of the About.com said "[The] humor and optimistic essence of SpongeBob is evident even in this first episode."

Episodes

The episodes are ordered below according to Nickelodeon's packaging order, and not their original production or broadcast order.

DVD release
The DVD boxset for season one was released by Paramount Home Entertainment and Nickelodeon in the United States and Canada in October 2003, two years after it had completed broadcast on television. The DVD release features bonus materials including audio commentaries, featurettes, and music videos. The pilot episode "Help Wanted" was excluded in the DVD release due to copyright issues. According to Derek Drymon, the episode was not included because Nickelodeon did not want to pay Tiny Tim's estate for the DVD rights. However, on the German release of the season one DVD, the episode "Help Wanted" actually is included. "Help Wanted" was later released on the SpongeBob SquarePants: The Complete 3rd Season DVD as a bonus feature on September 27, 2005. It was also released on the SpongeBob SquarePants: The First 100 Episodes DVD, alongside all the episodes of seasons one through five. The DVD included a featurette called "Help Wanted" the Seven Seas Edition that featured "Help Wanted" in numerous languages. The episode was also a bonus feature in the series DVD called SpongeBob SquarePants: 10 Happiest Moments that was released on September 14, 2010. Upon release, the DVD set was quickly sold out at Best Buy and was selling "briskly" at online retailers, including Amazon.com, Barnes & Noble and Walmart. In 2012, the DVD was released in slim packaging.

Notes

References

Bibliography

External links

 Season 1 at Metacritic

SpongeBob SquarePants seasons
1999 American television seasons
2000 American television seasons
2001 American television seasons